Mary Servoss (June 2, 1888 – November 20, 1968) was an American stage and screen actress. Her main career was centered on the Broadway stage.

She was born to Carlos A. Servoss and Mary (née Baker) in Chicago. She made her stage debut in 1905 in a stock company playing a small part in Lorna Doone. In 1922, she played Portia to David Warfield's Shylock in The Merchant of Venice, and she appeared in the 1929 play Street Scene, in the 1931 play Counsellor-at-Law starring Paul Muni, and as Queen Gertrude in  Hamlet opposite both Raymond Massey (1931) and Leslie Howard (1936).

She was a veteran stage actress when she made her first film in 1940 and made over 20 films by the time of her last film in 1949.

When not in the theatre, her hobby was restoring old farmhouses.

Mary Servoss died in Los Angeles on November 20, 1968.

Her papers are housed in the Charles E. Young Research Library at UCLA. The collection includes "correspondence, photographs, books, scrapbooks, and printed materials related to Servoss' life and career."


Select stage credits

Bedford's Hope (1906)
The Master of the House (1912)
Consequences (1914)
Upstairs and Down (1916)
Behold the Bridegroom (1927)
Street Scene (1929)
Tortilla Flat (1938)
Swan Song (1946)
Medea (1949)

Filmography

References

External links

1888 births
1968 deaths
Actresses from Chicago
20th-century American actresses
American film actresses
American stage actresses